The 1995 Kansas Jayhawks football team represented the University of Kansas as a member of the Big Eight Conference during the 1995 NCAA Division I-A football season. Led by eighth-year head coach Glen Mason, the Jayhawks compiled an overall record of 10–2 with a mark of 5–2 in conference play, placing in a three-way tie for second in the Big 8. Kansas was invited to the Aloha Bowl, where they beat UCLA. The team played home games at Memorial Stadium in Lawrence, Kansas.

1996 was Jayhawks' final season in the Big 8, which dissolved at the end of the 1995–96 academic year. Kansas and the other seven schools in the Big 8 became charter members of the Big 12 Conference in 1996.

The Jayhawks October 8 game against Kansas State is, as of the 2022 matchup, the only time in the 100+ year old rivalry that both teams were ranked. Kansas was ranked 6th and Kansas State was ranked 14th.

Schedule

Roster

Rankings

Game summaries

Cincinnati

at North Texas

TCU

Houston

at Colorado

Iowa State

at Oklahoma

at Kansas State

Missouri

Nebraska

at Oklahoma State

vs. UCLA (Aloha Bowl)

1996 NFL Draft

References

Kansas
Kansas Jayhawks football seasons
Aloha Bowl champion seasons
Kansas Jayhawks football